Gérard Laumon (born 1952) is a French mathematician, best known for his results in number theory, for which he was awarded the Clay Research Award.

Life and work
Laumon studied at the École Normale Supérieure and Paris-Sud 11 University, Orsay. He was awarded the Silver Medal of the CNRS in 1987, and the E. Dechelle prize of the French Academy of the Sciences in 1992.

In 2004, Laumon and Ngô Bảo Châu received the Clay Research Award for the proof of the fundamental lemma for unitary groups, a component in the Langlands program in number theory.

In 2012, he became a fellow of the American Mathematical Society.

Awards
Clay Research Award
CNRS Silver Medal
E. Dechelle Prize of the French Academy of Sciences

References

External links
Laumon's CMI lecture
Audio recording on a lecture at the Field Institute titled "On the fundamental lemma for unitary groups"

1952 births
Living people
École Normale Supérieure alumni
Paris-Sud University alumni
20th-century French mathematicians
21st-century French mathematicians
Clay Research Award recipients
Members of the French Academy of Sciences
Fellows of the American Mathematical Society